Gheorghe Antohi (12 March 1922 – 1997) was a Romanian equestrian. He competed in two events at the 1952 Summer Olympics.

References

1922 births
1997 deaths
Romanian male equestrians
Olympic equestrians of Romania
Equestrians at the 1952 Summer Olympics
Sportspeople from Târgoviște